Rip Haywire is an American serial comic strip written and illustrated by North Carolina artist Dan Thompson. It is a comics version of action/adventure entertainment like Indiana Jones, James Bond, and Steve Canyon for the Dilbert generation.

Publication history 
United Feature launched the strip in newspapers beginning 5 January 2009.

North Carolina's The Times-News has published the Rip Haywire comic strip since March 2, 2009.

Main characters 
There are four main characters: Rip Haywire, his cowardly talking collie TNT, his wife Breezy and his ex-girlfriend Cobra Carson.

In a one strip, they are joined by an orphan kid they dub R.J.

Rip marries Breezy Easy, a young lady with fiery red hair, on August 27, 2016.

In an interview with Times-News, Dan Thompson described his Rip, Cobra and TNT characters as the following:
 Rip Haywire is "a combination of classic action heroes such as James Bond, Indiana Jones and Jason Bourne."
 Cobra Carson is "always out for herself ... She's like all the James Bond girls rolled into one."
 TNT is "the opposite of Lassie."

Reception 
According to Madison Taylor, an editor of Times-News, the serial has detractors and fans among the paper readers. Some dislike serials, some desire more humor and less intrigue. Some like it because "it’s different than anything else" Times-News publishes and "it's also got an quirky sense of humor."

References

External links

 

American comic strips
2009 comics debuts
Action comics
Adventure comics
Gag-a-day comics